No Right to Die – Chinggis Khaan is a 2008 film directed by L Erdenebulgan based on the life of Temüjin, the young Genghis Khan and his unification of Mongolia, previously consisting of warring and minor kingdoms. The film is one of the largest-budgeted films produced in Mongolia.

External links
 Үхэж үл болно, Чингис хаан монголчуудыг байлдан дагуулж эхэллээ
 "ҮХЭЖ ҮЛ БОЛНО-ЧИНГИС ХААН" МУСК

Depictions of Genghis Khan on film
2008 films
Mongolian drama films
2008 biographical drama films
Films set in the 12th century
Films set in the 13th century
Films set in the Mongol Empire
Films set in Mongolia
2000s historical films
2008 drama films